Kilkenny railway station is located on the Grange and Outer Harbor lines. Situated in the western Adelaide suburb of West Kilkenny, it is six kilometres from Adelaide station. It uses Caution More Than One Train lights, and was the first on the line to have such lights.

History
The railway line from Adelaide to Port Adelaide opened in April 1856, but for the first 25 years, there was no station at Kilkenny. Kilkenny station was built when the single track  Port Adelaide railway was duplicated in 1881. Later, a network of goods sidings was subsequently installed on both sides of the main line to serve various factories which were established in the vicinity. By the early years of the 20th century, there were two signal cabins at Kilkenny – one at the Adelaide end of the station controlling access to sidings, the other at the Woodville Park end controlling the level crossing across David Terrace. In 1930, three-aspect colour-light signalling was installed on this section of the Port line in an effort to accommodate the close headways necessary with the heavy traffic of that era.

Kilkenny was busy with both passengers and goods by virtue of the industrial activity in the area. However, as heavy industries declined in the 1960s and 1970s, so did traffic to and from the station. The goods sidings were closed in September 1977 and were subsequently removed, along with the signal cabin. The nearby industrial factories were demolished in November 2018.

Services by platform

References

Rails Through Swamp and Sand – A History of the Port Adelaide Railway.  M. Thompson  pub. Port Dock Station Railway Museum (1988)

External links

Railway stations in Adelaide
Railway stations in Australia opened in 1881